Gondeh Jin (also Romanized as Gondeh Jīn; also known as Gandehjīn, Gandejin Hajebloo, Gand Jīn, Ganeh Jīn, and Gundajin) is a village in Sabzdasht Rural District, in the Central District of Kabudarahang County, Hamadan Province, Iran. At the 2006 census, its population was 196, in 54 families.

References 

Populated places in Kabudarahang County